The Yamaha YM2164, a.k.a. OPP (FM Operator Type P), is an FM synthesis sound chip developed by Yamaha, an enhanced version of their YM2151 (a.k.a. OPM). The OPP was used in various MIDI-based synthesizers by Yamaha - DX21, DX27, DX100, SFG-05, FB-01 (a standalone SFG-05) - plus several licensed products: the IBM Music Feature Card (which is effectively an FB-01 on an ISA card) and Korg's DS-8 and Korg 707.

The YM2164 has the following features:
Eight concurrent FM synthesis channels (voices) that may all be set to different timbres
Four operators per channel, all generating sine waves at configurable frequencies and powers
Eight options for routing those four operators to perform FM synthesis (via phase modulation) or simple additive synthesis
A sine-wave low frequency oscillator running 1 of 4 waveforms, mappable to pitch on a per-channel basis and/or amplitude on a per-operator basis
One Global Pitch Envelope Generator (Enabled for DX21 model only)

Compared to the OPM, the OPP has the same pinout and functional features but some minor changes to control registers. Differences are the test register address (9), the timer B resolution (period doubled: 2048 clock cycles on OPP vs. 1024 on OPM), and 8 undocumented registers (0-7). Due to how the FB-01 and IBM MFC hardware use those registers, swapping an OPM into these hosts does not operate correctly.

While the OPP was available for use by IBM and Korg, the chips were unavailable for purchase outside of Yamaha, compared to the almost identical and widely available OPM, which found its way into countless arcade game PCBs of the 1980s and 1990s as well as some home computers such as the X1 and X68000.

See also 
 Yamaha CX5M
 Yamaha YM2151
 Yamaha YM3812
 Yamaha YM2413

References

External links 
Yamaha FB-01 Service Manual (fdiskc.com)
Yamaha YM chips numerical classification (vorc.org)
Comprehensive list with descriptions of Yamaha chips used in synthesizers (dtech.lv)

YM2164